Stress-associated endoplasmic reticulum protein 1 is a protein that in humans is encoded by the SERP1 gene.

References

Further reading